Carbothermic reactions involve the reduction of substances, often metal oxides (O^2-), using carbon as the reducing agent.  These chemical reactions are usually conducted at temperatures of several hundred degrees Celsius. Such processes are applied for production of the elemental forms of many elements. The ability of metals to participate in carbothermic reactions can be predicted from Ellingham diagrams.

Carbothermal reactions produce carbon monoxide and sometimes carbon dioxide.  The facility of these conversions is attributable to the entropy of reaction: two solids, the metal oxide and carbon, are converted to a new solid (metal) and a gas (CO), the latter having high entropy.

Applications 

A prominent example is that of  iron ore smelting. Many reactions are involved, but the simplified equation is usually shown as:

 2 + 3C → 4Fe + 3

On a more modest scale, about 1 million tons of elemental phosphorus is produced annually by carbothermic reactions.  Calcium phosphate (phosphate rock) is heated to 1,200–1,500 °C with sand, which is mostly , and coke (impure carbon) to produce . The chemical equation for this process when starting with fluoroapatite, a common phosphate mineral, is:

 4  +  18  +  30C →   3  +  30CO  +  18  +  2

Of historic interest is the Leblanc process.  A key step in this process is the reduction of sodium sulfate with coal:
 Na2SO4 + 2 C → Na2S + 2 CO2

The Na2S is then treated with calcium carbonate to give sodium carbonate, a commodity chemical.

Recently, development of the 'MagSonic' carbothermic magnesium process has restarted interest in its chemistry:

   +   ↔     +  

The reaction is readily reversible from its product vapors, and requires rapid cooling to prevent back-reaction.

Variations 
Sometimes carbothermic reactions are coupled to other conversions.  One example is the chloride process for separating titanium from ilmenite, the main ore of titanium. In this process, a mixture of carbon and the crushed ore is heated at 1000 °C under flowing chlorine gas, giving titanium tetrachloride:

 2  +  7  +  6C → 2 + 2 + 6CO

For some metals, carbothermic reactions do not afford the metal, but instead give the metal carbide. This behavior is observed for titanium, hence the use of the chloride process. For this reason, aluminium is employed as the reducing agent.

References 

Chemical reactions